Lampetra ayresii is a species of lamprey in the family Petromyzontidae. It is also called the river lamprey or western river lamprey. It is found in the eastern Pacific, specifically from Tee Harbor, Juneau in Alaska to the Sacramento–San Joaquin drainage in California, USA. It can survive in both marine surface waters and freshwater lakes, rivers, and creeks. In freshwater, it is found typically in the lower portions of large river systems. It is a predatory fish and feeds on fishes in the size range of 10–30 cm. It feeds by attaching to prey using its round, sucker-like mouth. Adult western river lampreys typically grow to about  total length (TL), but can reach  TL.

Description
Western river lampreys are noted by their long body, round mouth, and lack of jaws. On their disk-like mouth is two teeth, one tooth on the tongue, 3 points on each central lateral tooth plate, and no posterior teeth. They have no scales, and are typically dark brown in color, with yellow bellies and silver around the head, gill openings and lower sides.

Western river lamprey larvae are very visually similar to Pacific lamprey and western brook lamprey larvae, and are virtually indistinguishable.

Life cycle 
Western River Lampreys live on average for 6–7 years, spending most of their life in freshwaters and only living in marine waters for about 10 weeks. Starting their lives as an ammocoete (larva), they burrow into the stream bottom and survive as filter feeders. They can live like this for 2–7 years, after which they begin a metamorphosis into their macropthalmia (juvenile) stage. This metamorphosis starts in the months of July–April, and can take up to 9–10 months, the longest of any lamprey. After metamorphosis, they enter the ocean as adults between the months of May and July. They spend a parasitic feeding phase here for 10 weeks, during which they grow rapidly and reach their maximum size. After their feeding phase, they migrate back to fresh waters to spawning areas. They likely prefer spawning areas upstream and with gravel bottoms. Both sexes will move around stones to construct the nests. Each female will then lay around 11,400 to 37,300 eggs. Adults die after the eggs are laid and fertilized.

Diet 
The river lamprey begins as a filter feeder in its ammocoete stage. During this time, they feed on algae and detritus. Parasitism begins in the adult stage and once it has reached 16.2 cm. During this time it feeds on 10–30 cm fishes, most commonly herring and salmon. To feed, it attaches to the back of its prey above the lateral line, using its round mouth. There it sucks on muscle tissue.

References

Lampetra
Fish of the Pacific Ocean
Freshwater fish of North America
Fish described in 1870
Taxa named by Albert Günther